Markku Lahti (born 18 April 1945) is a Finnish footballer. He played in two matches for the Finland national football team from 1964 to 1965. He played for FC Haka in Mestaruussarja.

Honours

As a player 
Valkeakosken Haka
 Mestaruussarja: 1965
 Suomen Cup: 1963

References

External links
 

1945 births
Living people
Finnish footballers
Finland international footballers
Place of birth missing (living people)
Association footballers not categorized by position